Keith George Fleming (16 November 1909 – 10 July 1985) was an  Australian rules footballer who played with Fitzroy and Hawthorn in the Victorian Football League (VFL).		

He was the younger brother of Frank Fleming and twin brother of Ian Fleming.

Notes

External links 
		

1909 births
1985 deaths
Australian rules footballers from Victoria (Australia)
Fitzroy Football Club players
Hawthorn Football Club players